Junior Super Stars (season 2) is a 2017 Tamil talent-search reality show, which aired on Zee Tamil on every Saturday and Sunday from 13 May 2017 to 24 September 2017 at 19:00 (IST) for 40 Episodes. It is a second season of the show Junior Super Star. which has children between the ages of 5–14 years as the participants. The judges are Actor and director K. Bhagyaraj, actress Roja and Anchor Archana. The season winner is Bhavass.

Winners
The second season grand finale episode of the Junior super star show will be held at the city Coimbatore, in Tamil Nadu. The Tamil comedy actor Santhanam will be the chief guest with Zee Tamil Family of the final round show.

Cast
Hosted
 Keerthi: who had appeared Tamil television reality shows host like Maanada Mayilada (Season:01-10) and Junior Super Star.

Judges
 K. Bhagyaraj: is an Indian director, actor, screenwriter and producer active mainly in Tamil films.
 Roja: is a South Indian actress. 
 Archana

Competitors
The show have 20 contestants vying with each other for the title.

 Aasmi
 Adithya
 Ajay
 Akshayaa
 Andrieya
 Anushka
 Bhavass
 Bhuvanika
 Hajeera
 Harishini
 Karmukil Vannan
 Lingwswaran
 Manisha
 Migamed Nafil
 Niharika
 ithya Sree
 Rithanya
 Roshan Krishna
 Saiharish
 Santhosh
 Varun
 Vishwa

Audition
The audition Audition Date is on 26 March 2017. 
 Coimbatore
 Madurai
 Trichy
 Chennai
 Salem
 Tirunelveli 
 Tiruppur

References

External links 
 Junior Super Stars 2 at ZEE5

Zee Tamil original programming
2017 Tamil-language television series debuts
Tamil-language children's television series
Tamil-language television shows
2017 Tamil-language television seasons
Television shows set in Tamil Nadu
2017 Tamil-language television series endings